Aadu may refer to:
 Aadu (film), a 2015 Malayalam film
 Aadu (name), an Estonian male given name

See also 
 Aadu Puli Attam (disambiguation)